Princess Magdalena Augusta of Anhalt-Zerbst (13 October 1679 – 11 October 1740) was, by birth, a Princess of Anhalt-Zerbst and, by marriage, a Duchess of Saxe-Gotha-Altenburg. She was the maternal grandmother of George III of the United Kingdom.

She was born Princess Magdalena Augusta of Anhalt-Zerbst. Her father was Karl of Anhalt-Zerbst and her mother was Duchess Sophia of Saxe-Weissenfels.

Family
In 1696, Magdalena Augusta married her first cousin, Frederick II, Duke of Saxe-Gotha-Altenburg, who had become Duke in 1691.
They had twenty children:
 Sophie (b. Gotha, 30 May 1697 – d. of smallpox, Gotha, 29 November 1703).
 Magdalena (b. Altenburg, 18 July 1698 – d. 13 November 1712).  
 Frederick III, Duke of Saxe-Gotha-Altenburg (b. Gotha, 14 April 1699 – d. Gotha, 10 March 1772).
 Stillborn son (Gotha, 22 April 1700).
 Wilhelm (b. Gotha, 12 March 1701 – d. Gräfentonna, 31 May 1771), married on 8 November 1742 to Anna of Holstein-Gottorp. Their marriage was childless.
 Karl Frederick (b. Gotha, 20 September 1702 – d. [of smallpox?] Gotha, 21 November 1703)
 Stillborn daughter (b. and d. Gotha, 8 May 1703).
 Johann August (b. Gotha, 17 February 1704 – d. Stadtroda, 8 May 1767).
 Christian (b. Gotha, 27 February 1705 – d. of smallpox, Gotha, 5 March 1705).
 Christian Wilhelm (b. Gotha, 28 May 1706 – d. Stadtroda, 19 July 1748), married on 27 May 1743 to Luise Reuss of Schleiz. Their marriage was childless.
 Ludwig Ernst (b. Gotha, 28 December 1707 – d. Gotha, 13 August 1763)
 Emanuel (b. Gotha, 5 April 1709 – d. Gotha, 10 October 1710).
 Moritz (b. Altenburg, 11 May 1711 – d. Altenburg, 3 September 1777).
 Sophie (b. Altenburg, 23 August 1712 – d. Altenburg, 12 November 1712).
 Karl (b. Gotha, 17 April 1714 – d. Gotha, 10 July 1715).
 Fredericka (b. Gotha, 17 July 1715 – d. Langensalza, 12 May 1775), married on 27 November 1734 to Johann Adolf II, Duke of Saxe-Weissenfels.
 Stillborn son (Gotha, 30 November 1716).
 Magdalena Sibylle (b. Gotha, 15 August 1718 – d. Gotha, 9 November 1718).
 Augusta (b. Gotha, 30 November 1719 – d. Carlton House, 8 February 1772), married on 8 May 1736 to Frederick, Prince of Wales.  They had 9 children; their second child later became King George III of Great Britain.
 Johann Adolf (b. Gotha, 18 May 1721 – d. Friedrichstanneck, 29 April 1799).

Ancestry

|-

References

Princesses of Saxe-Gotha-Altenburg
Duchesses of Saxe-Gotha-Altenburg
House of Ascania
House of Saxe-Gotha-Altenburg
1679 births
1740 deaths
Daughters of monarchs